= Paul W. Murrill =

American academic administrator and businessman (1934–2018)

- Born: Paul Whitfield Murrill; July 10, 1934; St. Louis, Missouri, U.S.
- Died: April 2, 2018 (aged 83)
- Education: University of Mississippi; Louisiana State University
- Occupations: Academic administrator, businessman
- Spouse: Nancy Hoover Williams

Paul W. Murrill (July 10, 1934, St. Louis, Missouri – April 2, 2018) was an American academic administrator and businessman. He was the chancellor of Louisiana State University from 1974 to 1981.
